Selsella is one of the 60 Legislative Assembly constituencies of Meghalaya state in India. It is part of West Garo Hills district and is reserved for candidates belonging to the Scheduled Tribes. It falls under Tura Lok Sabha constituency and its current MLA is Ferlin C. A. Sangma of National People's Party.

Members of Legislative Assembly
The list of MLAs are given below

 1972: William Cecil R Marak, Indian National Congress
 1978: Girash Marak, All Party Hill Leaders Conference
 1983: Atul C. Marak, Indian National Congress
 1988: Atul C. Marak, Indian National Congress
 1993: Atul C. Marak, Indian National Congress
 1998: Cyprian R. Sangma, People's Democratic Front
 2003: Cyprian R. Sangma, Nationalist Congress Party
 2005 (by-elections): Clement Marak, Indian National Congress
 2008: Conrad Sangma, Nationalist Congress Party
 2013: Clement Marak, Indian National Congress

Election results

2018

See also
List of constituencies of the Meghalaya Legislative Assembly
Tura (Lok Sabha constituency)
West Garo Hills district

References

Assembly constituencies of Meghalaya
West Garo Hills district